USS Stockdale may refer to the following ships of the United States Navy:

, was a steamer purchased in 1863. She served as a tinclad in the American Civil War and decommissioned in 1865
, was a destroyer escort commissioned in 1943 and decommissioned in 1946
, is an  guided missile destroyer commissioned in 2009

United States Navy ship names